Thymus integer is a strongly aromatic, sprawling, gnarled subshrub generally less than 10 cm high. It produces white to dark rosy purple flowers between March and June.

Habitat
This plant is often found on dry, rocky, igneous hillsides at altitudes of 100–1700 meters.

Distribution 
A Cyprus endemic, it is common in the Troödos Mountains and the Akamas area.

References

External links
 http://botany.cz/en/thymus-integer/
 http://encyclopaedia.alpinegardensociety.net/plants/Thymus/integer
 http://kypros.org/Projects/Laona/cyprus_thyme.html
 http://www.stridvall.se/flowers/gallery/Lamiaceae_2/715_10
 http://www.sciencephoto.com/media/101213/view

integer
Endemic flora of Cyprus
Herbs
Plants described in 1844